Madsen Mompremier (born 1952) is a Haitian oil painter, known for his depictions of Vodou gods (lwa).

Biography 
Mompremier was born in 1952 in Gonaives, Haiti. In 1972, he moved to Port-au-Prince to work as a tailor; just one year later, he began apprenticing under Gerard Valcin, pursuing interests in drawing and painting he had had since a young age. Originally, Mompremier painted images of daily life in Haiti. However, in 1975, he found his own means of expression in representing the Vodou lwa.. In 1978, Mompremier met his wife, Erzulie, who began painting under his direction; she passed in the earthquake of 2010. Mompremier is known worldwide for his art and, as such, has displayed his work internationally in Germany, France, and the United States.

Principal exhibitions 
2011 - Art and the Unbreakable Spirit of Haiti, Fowler Museum, Los Angeles, California, USA
2013 - Five Decades of Haitian Painting, University of Texas, Austin, Texas, USA

References

External links 
Galerie Monnin
Galerie Macondo

1952 births
Haitian artists
Living people